{{DISPLAYTITLE:Alpha1 Capricorni}}

Alpha1 Capricorni, Latinized from α1 Capricorni, is a distant, binary star system dominated by a highly luminous star in the constellation of Capricornus, north of the ecliptic. It has the traditional star names Prima Giedi and Algiedi Prima. The system is separated from the brighter Alpha2 Capricorni by 0.11° of the sky, a gap resolvable with the naked eye, similar to Mizar and Alcor. Both are not to be confused with much fainter 3 Capricorni nor somewhat fainter Nu Capricorni which are 3 to 6 times the angular distance apart than separate the two Alpha stars, respectively.

The primary star is a yellow hued supergiant star with a stellar classification of G3 Ib. It has an apparent magnitude of +4.3; bright enough to make it visible to the naked eye. The star is located at a distance of approximately 870 light years from the solar system based on parallax measurements, but is drifting closer with a radial velocity of −25 km/s. The star is past first dredge-up and has already evolved through the Cepheid instability strip; it may be about to do so a second time. It has 5.3 times the mass and 36 times the radius of the Sun, and is radiating around 1,047 times the Sun's luminosity from its photosphere at an effective temperature of 5,119 K.

This magnitude 8.60 star forms a binary pair with α1 Capricorni. Three other faint visual companion stars lie within one arc-minute, so are unresolveable in small telescopes. The brightest of these is 10th magnitude and on this basis it has often been considered as an optical binary. Separation is increasing rapidly due to great proper motion of the primary star.

In popular culture
The name Giedi Prime is used for a fictional planet in Frank Herbert's 1965 science fiction novel Dune. This Giedi Prime is a planet of the star 36 Ophiuchi B, and is the home world of the villainous House Harkonnen.

See also
Alpha Capricorni

References

G-type supergiants
Double stars

Capricornus (constellation)
Capricorni, Alpha1
Durchmusterung objects
Capricorni, 05
192876
100027
7747
Algiedi Prima